Arthur Mund (born 10 February 1899, date of death unknown) was a German diver who competed in the 1928 Summer Olympics. He was the husband of Margret Borgs and the father of Günther Mund and Lilo Mund.

In 1928 he finished fifth in the 3 metre springboard event.

References

External links
 

1899 births
Year of death missing
German male divers
Olympic divers of Germany
Divers at the 1928 Summer Olympics
20th-century German people